Baldwin's Book Barn is an independent bookstore in West Chester, Pennsylvania.  It was founded in 1946 by William and Lilla Baldwin. The store is located in a five-story barn built in 1822.

In the November 8, 1998 edition of The Baltimore Sun, Terry Conway described the store as a "treasure for passionate book lovers".

In 2010 the store was put up for sale. $10,000 of rare books were stolen from the store in 2019.

References

External links 
 Official site
 Baldwin's Book Barn Tour from C-SPAN

1946 establishments in Pennsylvania
Independent bookstores of the United States
Buildings and structures in Chester County, Pennsylvania